Kentish Town North is a ward in the London Borough of Camden, in the United Kingdom. The ward will represent the northern part of Kentish Town. The ward will first be used for the 2022 Camden London Borough Council election, and will elect two councillors to Camden London Borough Council. Most of its area was previously in the Kentish Town ward, which will be abolished at the same time. In 2018, the ward had an electorate of 5,936. The Boundary Commission projects the electorate to rise to 6,205 in 2025.

Election results

Elections in the 2020s

References

Wards of the London Borough of Camden
Kentish Town
2022 establishments in England